Leskoec is a village in the Resen Municipality of North Macedonia, west of Lake Prespa. Situated near the Albanian border, it is located under  from Resen.

Demographics
Leskoec has a dozen inhabitants, as of the most recent national census in 2002, a fraction of its 1961 population.

References

Villages in Resen Municipality